American Gothic is an American horror series created by Shaun Cassidy. The show first aired on CBS on September 22, 1995, and was cancelled after a single season on July 11, 1996. The show received positive reviews and has been regarded as a cult classic.

Plot
The story takes place in the fictional town of Trinity, South Carolina, and revolves around Caleb Temple (Lucas Black) and the town's corrupt sheriff, Lucas Buck (Gary Cole). Though appearing affable and charismatic, Sheriff Buck is a murderous rapist whose power base is backed by apparent supernatural powers, which he generally uses to manipulate people to "fulfill their potential" and make life-changing choices (usually for evil).

Caleb Temple is a normal child whose paternity masks a horrific secret: Lucas Buck is his biological father, having raped his mother in front of Caleb's older sister Merlyn (Sarah Paulson). The horror of watching her mother being sexually assaulted caused Merlyn to become severely emotionally traumatized and withdrawn from the rest of the world, made even worse when her mother committed suicide after giving birth to Caleb.

During the pilot episode of the series, Sheriff Buck murders Merlyn in cold blood and manipulates Caleb's "father" (Sonny Shroyer) into committing suicide in order to eliminate Caleb's family and claim his biological son for his own. The newly arrived Dr. Crower (Jake Weber) begins to uncover the sheriff's role in the deaths of Merlyn and Merlyn's father and with help from Caleb's out-of-town cousin Gail Emory (Paige Turco), struggles to prevent Lucas from corrupting young Caleb. They are aided in part by Merlyn's ghost, who personally appears before Caleb throughout the series in order to try to keep him from Buck's corrupt grasp.

Cast of characters

Main cast

Recurring cast

Note: The character of Dr. Billy Peale (John Mese) was a late addition to the series, intended to be a regular character to replace Dr. Matt Crower as a more formidable adversary to Lucas Buck. He was added to the opening credits in the episode "Doctor Death Takes a Holiday", in which Dr. Crower is written out. Producer Shaun Cassidy stated in interviews that Dr. Crower would have returned had the show been renewed for a second season.

Episodes
CBS originally aired American Gothic in a differing sequence than the production order and omitted four episodes ("Potato Boy", "Ring of Fire", "Echo of Your Last Goodbye" and "Strangler") from its network broadcast. Subsequent, syndicated airings of the series included these four episodes.

Home media
Universal Studios released the complete series of American Gothic on DVD as a Region 1 NTSC double-sided 3-disc set in the United States (October 25, 2005) and as a Region 2 PAL single-sided 6-disc set in Europe (released March 20, 2006).

The Region 1 and Region 2 Discs have the episodes in the same order (by air date as opposed to producer's intended order). The only exception is the German boxset (released October 5, 2007 by "Koch Media Home Entertainment"), which features all episodes in the intended order on 7 DVDs. The orders are as follows:

Award nominations

References

External links

 
 American Gothic at TV Guide.com

1995 American television series debuts
1996 American television series endings
1990s American drama television series
1990s American supernatural television series
1990s American horror television series
CBS original programming
English-language television shows
Television series about ghosts
Gothic television shows
Television series by Universal Television
Television shows set in South Carolina
Television shows filmed in North Carolina
Television shows filmed in Wilmington, North Carolina
Television series created by Shaun Cassidy
Cultural depictions of Albert DeSalvo